Barker, New York can refer to:
Barker, Broome County, New York, town
Barker, Niagara County, New York, village